Bobo Nkeolisakwu Fred Obi-Ajudua (born 30 June 1990), known as Bobo, is a Nigerian entertainment lawyer and youth advocate.

Background and education 
Ajudua is from Ibusa in Oshimili North, Delta State. He spent the early years of his life in Lagos State, Nigeria. He attended American International School of Lagos for his primary education, and then the British International School Lagos for his secondary school. He went on to attain a law degree from the University of Essex in 2011 and subsequently, graduated the Nigerian Law School in 2012.

He is the only son of Nigerian lawyer and parliamentarian Hon. Pat Ajudua. His mother is the Chief Whip of the Delta State House of Assembly, representing Oshimili North.

Career 
Ajudua began his career at the Nigeria Football Federation headquarters in Abuja. He worked in the Legal Unit, where he was tasked with handling issues pertaining to Sports Law and the laws guiding the governing body of football, FIFA. He also handled player contracts, player-club dispute resolution and agent licensing.

He is the founder and principal partner of BFA & Co. Legal. He is the lawyer to various Nigerian celebrities including Davido and the DMW music label, Wande Coal, Fresh vdm, Dremo, Toyin Abraham, Peruzzi and May D. He also represents the legal and business interest of Big Brother Naija housemates like KiddWaya, Angel Smith, Khafi, Bella, Beauty, Khloe, amongst others.

He also represented the legal interests of  Nigerian football players William Troost-Ekong, Leon Balogun and boxer Lawrence Okolie.

While Nigerian politician Femi Fani Kayode is also among his clientele.

He was the facilitator in securing deals with Martell, 1xbet, Ciroc, Aspira, Durex and boohooMAN deals for Davido, KiddWaya, amongst others. He was also one of the first among Davido’s team to break the ice regarding Davido returning to music in 2023 after his hiatus following the death of his son, Ifeanyi.

Ajudua expressed his opinion that Wizkid deserved to win at least one of the two awards he was nominated for at the 64th Annual Grammy Awards. Being Davido's lawyer, and couoled with the fact that there is a rivalry between Davido and Wizkid,
 his statement spurred mixed reactions amongst Davido stans.

Advocacy 

Ajudua spoke against the police brutality meted on youths during the EndSARS protest, terming it as "counter productive".

He was also part of dialogue committee set up by the Speaker of the Nigerian House of Representatives Femi Gbajabiamila that spearheaded the Police Service Commission Reform bill, alongside other participants such as the erstwhile Inspector-General of Police Mohammed Adamu; President, Nigerian Bar Association Olumide Akpata; Executive Secretary, National Human Rights Commission (NHRC) Dr. Tony Ojukwu; Director, Centre for Democracy and Development Idayat Hassan and chairman, Police Service Commission, Musiliu Smith.

Awards and recognition 
He was recognised by Sony for his role and contributions in David’s music career. In 2020 he was given plaques in commemoration of the FALL and RISKY’s platinum status. Most recently, his legal firm BFA & Co Legal was recently nominated at the ESQ Nigerian Legal Awards as the Law Firm of the year(Small Practice) and Media/Entertainment team of the year. Ajudua himself was also nominated for the ESQ Rising Star 40 under 40 awards.

Personal life 
He is married to Naomi Ajudua (née Giwa). Together they have a son named Nathaniel. His personal interests include luxury fashion, football, travel and lifestyle. Ajudua is also the child in the meme of the boy carrying two bottles.

References 

1990 births
Living people
Alumni of the University of Essex
Igbo people
People from Igbuzo
People from Delta State
Nigerian lawyers